Jonathan Leonardo Lacerda Araujo (born 7 February 1987) is a Uruguayan footballer, who plays as a centre-back.

Club career

Lacerda made his professional debut with Montevideo Wanderers in 2005. He is mainly used as a central defender. Lacerda played with Montevideo Wanderers until 2010, when he was transferred to Mexican club Santos Laguna.
On the final of the "Torneo Bicentenario" he scored a penalty kick.

On 2011 Lacerda was loaned to Club Atlas where he played 16 games.

For the Apertura 2012 he was loaned to Ascenso MX team, Necaxa

Lacerda play for Puebla from Clausura 2012 until Clausura 2013.

He return to Santos Laguna for the Clausura 2013, playing a total of 14 games, but was listed on the transfer list for the next tournament.

For the Clausura 2015, Dorados announced Lacerda as their new defender. He was the leader of the defense. On the transfer window celebrated in Cancun, Mexico, Dorados announced via Twitter that they had purchase Lacerda's rights in an undisclosed fee.

External links
 
 
 

1987 births
Living people
Uruguayan footballers
Uruguayan expatriate footballers
Footballers from Montevideo
Association football defenders
Uruguayan Primera División players
Liga MX players
Santos Laguna footballers
Atlas F.C. footballers
Club Puebla players
Club Necaxa footballers
Montevideo Wanderers F.C. players
Rampla Juniors players
Club Olimpia footballers
Dorados de Sinaloa footballers
FC Juárez footballers
Salamanca CF UDS players
Club Alianza Lima footballers
Uruguayan expatriate sportspeople in Mexico
Uruguayan expatriate sportspeople in Paraguay
Uruguayan expatriate sportspeople in Spain
Uruguayan expatriate sportspeople in Peru
Expatriate footballers in Mexico
Expatriate footballers in Paraguay
Expatriate footballers in Spain
Expatriate footballers in Peru